Perrault (1977–2001) was a British-bred Champion Thoroughbred racehorse who competed successfully in both France and the United States. A grandson of Tanerko, Perrault's great-grandsire was the French champion Tantieme who won the Prix de l'Arc de Triomphe back-to- back in 1950 and 1951. Racing at age three and four in France, Perrault won five important Conditions races.

Owned by Swiss businessman Serge Fradkoff and the Dutch banker Baron Thierry van Zuylen, a member of the Rothschild family, in 1982 Perrault was sent to race in the United States. Based in California, under U.S. Hall Of Fame trainer Charlie Whittingham, Perrault won several important races including the prestigious Arlington Million and Hollywood Gold Cup. He finished first in the 1982 Santa Anita Handicap but was disqualified to second.

Perrault was considered the leading candidate for U.S. Horse of the Year honors until he injured a tendon while competing in the Marlboro Cup and had to be retired. Nonetheless, his 1982 performances still earned him the Eclipse Award for Outstanding Male Turf Horse.

Syndicated and retired to stud duty, Perrault sired 119 winners before he died in 2001.

References
 Perrault's pedigree and racing stats
 New York Times article on Perrault's retirement

1977 racehorse births
2001 racehorse deaths
Thoroughbred family 1-w
Racehorses bred in the United Kingdom
Racehorses trained in France
Racehorses trained in the United States
Eclipse Award winners